The 2016–17 Northern Arizona Lumberjacks women's basketball team represented Northern Arizona University during the 2016–17 NCAA Division I women's basketball season. The Lumberjacks, led by fifth year head coach Sue Darling, played their home games at the Walkup Skydome. They were members of the Big Sky Conference. They finished the season 6–24, 2–16 in Big Sky to finish in tenth place. They lost in the first round of the Big Sky women's tournament to Portland State.

Roster

Schedule

|-
!colspan=9 style="background:#003466; color:#FFCC00;"| Non-conference regular season

|-
!colspan=9 style="background:#003466; color:#FFCC00;"| Big Sky regular season

|-
!colspan=9 style="background:#003466; color:#FFCC00;"| Big Sky Women's Tournament

See also
2016–17 Northern Arizona Lumberjacks men's basketball team

References

Northern Arizona
Northern Arizona Lumberjacks women's basketball seasons